Winsor Building is located in Asbury Park, Monmouth County, New Jersey, United States. The building was built in 1904 and was added to the National Register of Historic Places on September 13, 1979.

See also
National Register of Historic Places listings in Monmouth County, New Jersey

References

Commercial buildings on the National Register of Historic Places in New Jersey
Buildings and structures completed in 1904
Buildings and structures in Monmouth County, New Jersey
Asbury Park, New Jersey
National Register of Historic Places in Monmouth County, New Jersey
New Jersey Register of Historic Places